Ptychotricos is a genus of moths in the subfamily Arctiinae.

Species
 Ptychotricos elongata Schaus, 1905
 Ptychotricos episcepsidis Draudt, 1931
 Ptychotricos fenestrifer Zerny, 1931
 Ptychotricos zeus Schaus, 1894

References

Natural History Museum Lepidoptera generic names catalog

Arctiinae